North Carolina's 38th House district is one of 120 districts in the North Carolina House of Representatives. It has been represented by Democrat Abe Jones since 2021.

Geography
Since 2003, the district has included part of Wake County. The district overlaps with the 13th, 14th, and 15th Senate districts.

District officeholders since 1983

Election results

2022

2020

2018

2016

2014

2012

2010

2008

2006

2004

2002

2000

References

North Carolina House districts
Wake County, North Carolina